Walter de Clifford may refer to one of three generations of Marcher Lords:

Walter de Clifford (died 1190)
Walter de Clifford (died 1221)
Walter de Clifford (died 1263)

See also
Clifford (surname)